The Rugby Art Gallery and Museum is a combined art gallery and museum in central Rugby, Warwickshire, in England. The purpose-built building housing it is shared with Rugby library; it was opened in 2000 and was built in the place of Rugby's previous library.

The art gallery holds "The Rugby Collection", over 170 items of 20th century and contemporary British art, including prints, drawings and paintings by artists such as L. S. Lowry, Stanley Spencer, Paula Rego and Graham Sutherland. The collection was built up by Rugby Borough Council from 1946 onwards and still collects "works by British artists of 'promise and renown' ". There is also a "Local Art Collection".

The museum hosts a collection of Roman artefacts, excavated from the nearby Roman town of Tripontium. It also has a display of the social and industrial history of Rugby, and the "Redding Collection" of some 25,000 mid-20th-century photographic negatives taken at the Rugby photographic studio of George Redding. In December 2006, the Rugby World Cup was exhibited at the museum.

The facility became the permanent physical home of the World Rugby Hall of Fame in November 2016. However this was closed in 2021, due to financial pressures on the local council, and lower than expected visitor numbers.

The building also houses the town's visitor centre.

As part of a national venture called Get it Loud in Libraries, the building has played host to gigs of various music artists such as Plan B and British Sea Power.

See also
 Webb Ellis Rugby Football Museum, also in Rugby.

References

External links

Get it Loud in Libraries

Museums in Warwickshire
Art museums and galleries in Warwickshire
Local museums in Warwickshire
Libraries in Warwickshire
Art museums established in 2000
2000 establishments in England
Rugby union museums and halls of fame
Sports museums in England
Buildings and structures in Rugby, Warwickshire